Arthur Brown Ritchie (October 18, 1885 – April 20, 1977) was a Canadian politician. He served in the Legislative Assembly of British Columbia from 1945 to 1952  from the electoral district of Salmon Arm, a member of the Coalition government.

References

1885 births
1977 deaths